Love in the Real World is the second studio album by Australian country music artist Sherrié Austin. It was released in 1999 by Arista Nashville and peaked at #14 on the Billboard Top Country Albums chart. The album includes the singles "Never Been Kissed" and "Little Bird."

Track listing

Personnel
As listed in liner notes.

Eddie Bayers – drums, percussion
Pat Buchanan – electric guitar, 12-string guitar
Joe Chemay – bass guitar
John Christopher Davis – background vocals
Dan Dugmore – pedal steel guitar, lap steel guitar, acoustic guitar, electric guitar, 12-string guitar
Connie Ellisor – violin
Larry Franklin – fiddle
Paul Franklin – pedal steel guitar, Dobro
John Hobbs – piano, Hammond B-3 organ, synthesizer
Dann Huff – electric guitar
Paul Leim – drums
Joey Miskulin – accordion
Gary Morse – pedal steel guitar
Russ Pahl – pedal steel guitar
Kim Parent – background vocals
Will Rambeaux – acoustic guitar
Tom Roady – percussion
Brent Rowan – electric guitar, acoustic guitar, electric sitar
John Wesley Ryles – background vocals
Darrell Scott – acoustic guitar, mandolin, bouzouki
Eric Silver – mandolin
Biff Watson – acoustic guitar, high-strung guitar, GP-8
Dennis Wilson – background vocals

Chart performance

References

[ Love in the Real World] at Allmusic

1999 albums
Sherrié Austin albums
Arista Records albums